The 1990 Banquet Frozen Foods 300 was a NASCAR Winston Cup Series racing event that took place on June 10, 1990, at Sears Point International Raceway in Sonoma, California.

Mike Chase, Butch Gilliland, and Jack Sellers would make their introductions into the NASCAR Cup Series in this event while Stan Barrett and Ted Kennedy would leave the Cup Series after this event.

Race report
A grand total of 44 American-born drivers participated in this 74-lap event. Hershel McGriff was the unfortunate last-place finisher due to a problematic stock car engine on the second lap. While Jack Sellers was the last man to actually finish the event, a faulty engine on lap 70 prevented Morgan Shepherd from finishing anywhere except in the middle of the pack. The average green flag run was determined to be 6 laps; with slightly more than 32% of the entire race being run under a caution flag. Race-related accidents and vehicles stalling out on the relatively long road course track where the majority of the reasons behind the yellow flag laps.

Ricky Rudd had two tire issues in the mid section of this one but came back to finish third; he was running second at the end until Mark Martin passed him and began to quickly close on Rusty. However, the final caution ended his chances of catching the #27 vehicle. Martin also himself had issues, making contact with Dale Earnhardt on a restart early on just as Rudd had his first tire issue.

After two hours and forty-five minutes of racing, Rusty Wallace would defeat Mark Martin under the race's final caution flag; Wallace's high-speed training here paid off with this being the first of his two trips to victory lane in NASCAR Cup series action on the California road course. Amongst the drivers who failed to qualify for the race were Jimmy Means and Mike Hickingbottom. Mark Martin would maintain a 62-point lead for the 1990 Winston Cup Series championship against Morgan Shepherd after this event was through. This would be Rusty's last road course until 1996 at this track, then the last one of his career. It was a very road course heavy early career for Rusty then the wins dried up on road courses after that.

West Series driver and occasional Truck Series racer Terry Fisher was competitive all race and ended up a more-than-respectable 15th on the lead lap.

After this race, Mark Martin had a 136-point lead over Dale Earnhardt who was 4th in points after this race. Mark didn't lose the championship because of the penalty at Richmond. He lost it because Earnhardt dominated the rest of the year and took the championship away from him.

Individual earnings for each driver ranged from the winner's share of $69,100 ($ when adjusted for inflation) to the last-place finisher's share of $3,325 ($ when adjusted for inflation). NASCAR officials were authorized to hand out a sum of $443,457 to all the drivers who qualified for this racing event ($ when adjusted for inflation).

Top 10 finishers

Timeline
Section reference: 
 Start of race: Ricky Rudd started out with the pole position.
 Lap 2: A blown engine made Hershel McGriff into the event's last-place finisher.
 Lap 5: Caution due to Jack Sellers' accident, ended on lap 7.
 Lap 10: Caution due to Ted Kennedy's accident, ended on lap 11.
 Lap 12: Ernie Irvan took over the lead from Ricky Rudd.
 Lap 17: Rob Moroso had a terminal crash.
 Lap 19: Mike Chase took over the lead from Ernie Irvan.
 Lap 23: Rusty Wallace took over the lead from Mike Chase.
 Lap 31: Tommy Kendall took over the lead from Rusty Wallace.
 Lap 35: Rusty Wallace took over the lead from Tommy Kendall.
 Lap 38: Brett Bodine had a terminal crash while Harry Gant managed to wander off the course.
 Lap 41: Dick Trickle's engine issue forced him to leave the race.
 Lap 43: Caution due to Dick Trickle having his vehicle come to a stop on turn two, ended on lap 44.
 Lap 46: Tommy Kendall had a terminal crash; forcing him to exit the race early.
 Lap 54: Bobby Hillin Jr. took over the lead from Rusty Wallace.
 Lap 58: Ricky Rudd took over the lead from Bobby Hillin Jr..
 Lap 60: Rusty Wallace took over the lead from Ricky Rudd.
 Lap 62: Terry Labonte's issues with his vehicles clutch ended his race weekend too early.
 Lap 63: Caution due to an accident involving Kyle Petty and two other drivers, ended on lap 66.
 Lap 70: Morgan Shepherd's problematic engine forced him to leave the race.
 Lap 74: Caution due to Terry Labonte having his vehicle come to a stop on turn 11.
 Finish: Rusty Wallace was officially declared the winner of the event.

Standings after the race

References

Banquet Frozen Foods 300
Banquest Frozen Foods 300
NASCAR races at Sonoma Raceway